Raghunath Singha Dev II was the fifty-fourth king of the Mallabhum. He ruled from 1702 to 1712.

History

Personal life
Raghunath Singha Dev II and his wife Princess Chandraprava of Chetbarda had no children so his younger brother Gopal Singha Dev was the next king.

Mughals
Raghunath Singha Dev was the son of Durjan Singha Dev and a very brave king. He took care of his military force. He was also a very pious king and very much fond of music, dance and other performing arts. His time period. coincides the Aurangjeb and Bahadur Shah’s reign. During his rule Jijia tax(Jizya) was imposed. During the time of Alamgir Aurangjeb, who was very orthodox, as per his order any type of performing art was strictly prohibited. Ignoring his order Raghunath Singha Dev II developed Bishnupur as a very important place of performing art. He brought Ustad Bahadur Khan a descendant of Tansen in a monthly payment of rupees 500 and Pir Box. Gradually Bishnupur gave us several vocalists, instrumentalists and other performing artists. A new gharana of classical music named as Bishnupur gharana developed. In his regime. Shobha Singha was Zamindar of Chetuwa — Baroda (Midnapur) rose in revolt against the Mughals.

References

Sources
 
 O’Malley, L.S.S., ICS, Bankura, Bengal District Gazetteers, pp. 21-46(26), 1995 reprint, first published 1908, Government of West Bengal.

Malla rulers
Kings of Mallabhum
18th-century Indian monarchs
Mallabhum
Mallabhum temples